Dumitru Moțpan (3 May 1940 – 23 June 2018) was a Moldovan politician, who served as the President of the Moldovan Parliament. He died on June 23, 2018.

References

1940 births
2018 deaths
Moldovan communists
Presidents of the Moldovan Parliament
Moldovan MPs 1994–1998
Agrarian Party of Moldova politicians
People from Nisporeni District